Terracide is a zero-G first-person shooter developed by Simis and published by Eidos Interactive in 1997.

Gameplay
Terracide plays out in a six degrees of freedom style, much like Descent, in a similar way in which the player is mostly cruising around levels until they find an enemy to attack, although sometimes the player is given on-screen objectives which are required to be completed to continue. Mouse controls are disabled by default, although add-ons such as an on-screen crosshair or mouse control can be enabled in the game's menu.

Reviews
Stephen Poole on CNET's Reviews section rates Terracide 3/5 as "Good", with its major flaws commented that Terracide is "an unabashed Descent clone coupled with a tired "save the earth from destruction by alien invaders" story", and its biggest issue was the control in which "it was almost impossible to line up shots on a consistent basis because the ship wouldn't stop turning when I wanted it to". Terracide is still rated as a decent 3D shooter by GameSpot, proudly ending the review commenting that if you can get along the delayed controls, the game is a definite buy.

Reviews
PC Zone
The Adrenaline Vault
Génération 4

References

External links

1997 video games
Eidos Interactive games
Simis games
Video games with 6 degrees of freedom
Windows games
Windows-only games
Zero-G shooters
Video games developed in the United Kingdom